Union Township is a township in Washington County, Pennsylvania, United States. The population was 5,367 at the 2020 census.

History
The Dusmal House and Mingo Creek Presbyterian Church and Churchyard are listed on the National Register of Historic Places.

Geography
According to the United States Census Bureau, the township has a total area of 15.7 square miles (40.8 km2), of which, 15.4 square miles (39.8 km2) of it is land and 0.4 square miles (1.0 km2) of it (2.41%) is water.

Surrounding, adjacent and inner neighborhoods
Union Township has five land borders, including South Park Township and Jefferson Hills (both in Allegheny County) to the north, Carroll Township to the south, and Nottingham and Peters Townships to the west.  Across the Monongahela River in Allegheny County, Union Township runs adjacent with Forward Township in Allegheny County.  The separate borough of Finleyville is located entirely within the west-northwest section of the township.

Demographics
At the 2000 census there were 5,599 people, 2,300 households, and 1,674 families living in the township.  The population density was 364.3 people per square mile (140.6/km2).  There were 2,376 housing units at an average density of 154.6/sq mi (59.7/km2).  The racial makeup of the township was 98.25% White, 0.68% African American, 0.04% Native American, 0.16% Asian, 0.23% from other races, and 0.64% from two or more races. Hispanic or Latino of any race were 0.54%.

Of the 2,300 households 27.5% had children under the age of 18 living with them, 59.0% were married couples living together, 10.7% had a female householder with no husband present, and 27.2% were non-families. 24.0% of households were one person and 12.0% were one person aged 65 or older.  The average household size was 2.43 and the average family size was 2.88.

The age distribution was 21.0% under the age of 18, 5.7% from 18 to 24, 28.6% from 25 to 44, 26.9% from 45 to 64, and 17.8% 65 or older.  The median age was 42 years. For every 100 females, there were 95.4 males.  For every 100 females age 18 and over, there were 91.9 males.

The median household income was $41,962 and the median family income  was $50,858. Males had a median income of $40,583 versus $21,882 for females. The per capita income for the township was $19,560.  About 3.2% of families and 4.9% of the population were below the poverty line, including 7.3% of those under age 18 and 6.1% of those age 65 or over.

Notable people
Al Helfer, radio sportscaster.

References

External links
 Union Township website

Townships in Washington County, Pennsylvania
Pittsburgh metropolitan area
Townships in Pennsylvania